Over My Dead Body is an American police crime drama which was aired on the CBS television network from October 26, 1990 to June 20, 1991 as part of its 1990 fall lineup on Friday night at 9:00 p.m. Eastern time.

Over My Dead Body stars Edward Woodward as Maxwell Beckett, an aging mystery novelist whose three successful early novels were starting to be overshadowed by the reputation his two most recent works had developed as being "bombs." He was approached by young, struggling reporter Nikki Page (Jessica Lundy) who wrote for the San Francisco Union, and who came to him for help after witnessing a murder through her window and because he was her favorite author. After they solved this mystery, they became fast friends and began to work together in the "amateur sleuth" tradition to solve crimes.

Over My Dead Body was produced by William Link, the man responsible for Murder, She Wrote, but while it shared the theme of an aging mystery writer as an amateur sleuth in real life, it shared none of the earlier program's success. It was cancelled after a run of less than three months, although a few leftover episodes were aired in June 1991.

Cast
 Edward Woodward as Maxwell Beckett
 Jessica Lundy as Nikki Page

Episodes

References
Brooks, Tim and Marsh, Earle, The Complete Directory to Prime Time Network and Cable TV Shows

External links

CBS original programming
1990s American crime drama television series
Television series by Universal Television
1990 American television series debuts
1991 American television series endings
Television shows set in San Francisco
English-language television shows
Television shows about writers